The Frogville is a 2014 Taiwanese 3D animated children's film. It was released on October 3.

Box Office
The film has earned NT$510,000 in Taipei.

References

2014 3D films
2014 animated films
2014 films
Taiwanese 3D films
Taiwanese animated films
Taiwanese children's films
3D animated films
Animated films about frogs